Blue Mustang, or Mustang, and colloquially known as Blucifer, is a cast-fiberglass sculpture of a mustang located at Denver International Airport (DEN). Colored bright blue, with illuminated glowing red eyes, it is notable both for its striking appearance and for having killed its sculptor, Luis Jiménez, when a section of it fell on him at his studio.

Construction

Origins 
Blue Mustang was commissioned in 1992 for $300,000, and was not erected at DIA until 2008. Like most public art in Denver, the statue was paid for by developers, who since 1988 have been required to contribute 1% of the cost of major capital projects to public art in the city.

The original proposal had been for a sculpture of a buffalo stampede, but this was deemed inappropriate, since buffalo had been hunted to near extinction in the West. So, Jiménez proposed a mustanga symbol of the West and an early method of long-distance travel.

The piece was partly modeled on Jiménez's own Appaloosa stallion, Blackjack, a horse he bought in fulfillment of a childhood desire after becoming a successful artist.

Prior to creating the 32-foot Blue Mustang, Jiménez completed five similar horse sculptures at a smaller scale. Four are held in private collections, but the 8-foot Mesteño, which was completed in 1997 and served as one-quarter model for the 32-foot sculpture, has been part of the University of Oklahoma's public collection since 1998.

Medical setbacks 
On top of existing health issues, Jiménez suffered a heart attack and required surgery on his hands.

Legal disputes 
After missed deadlines, the city sued Jiménez for the $165,000 it had paid him up front of his $300,000 commission. Jiménez countersued. Mediation decided that Jiménez would complete the sculpture.

Fatal accident 
Jiménez was killed in 2006 at age 65 in his studio in Hondo, New Mexico, when one of the sculpture's three sections came loose from a hoist, pinning him against a steel support beam and severing an artery in his leg. He bled to death on his studio floor before being declared dead on arrival at the nearest hospital.

Completion 
Prior to his death, Jiménez had declared the painting of the head complete. After his death, friends and family contemplated whether to leave the sculpture incomplete, to destroy it, or to complete it. To honor his legacy, though perhaps also to avoid having to pay the City of Denver for failure to deliver on a contract, they elected to complete the sculpture, which was completed with the help of the artist's staff, family, and professional lowrider/racecar painters Camillo Nuñez and Richard LaVato. Upon completion, the sculpture was sent to California for assembly and then shipped to Denver. Blue Mustang was unveiled at Denver International Airport on February 11, 2008.

Appearance

Size 
At 32 feet (9.8 m) and approximately 9,000 pounds (4,100 kg) including its steel armature, the statue is by far the largest of Jiménez's career.

Eyes 
Like a number of other animal sculptures by Jiménez, the statue has glowing eyes, which are a tribute to his father, who ran a neon sign shop Jiménez worked at as a youth in El Paso.

The eyes are illuminated by LED flood lights.

Color 
Some early sketches had the sculpture as yellow or pink. The choice of blue may have been inspired by Jiménez's own horse, Blackjack, a blue roan Appaloosa.
The paintwork is a tribute to the lowrider culture Jiménez grew up with in El Paso. In a 2016 April Fools' Day joke, DIA held a Facebook poll to choose a new color for the horse.

Location 
The sculpture was bolted onto a concrete base on a hill in the median of Peña Boulevard. While original designs involved a more ornate base and a pull-off where viewers could get much closer to the sculpture, the pull-off idea was nixed after 9/11 over security concerns. There had also been a push to put the sculpture inside the terminal, but the space was needed for the Transportation Security Administration. Visitors cannot get close to the sculpture.

Reception

Public reaction 
The sculpture has been both widely disparaged and praised. Locals have taken to calling the statue Blucifer, though the artist's estate dislikes the demonic associations.
A Facebook group made in 2009 garnered national attention for requesting that the sculpture be removed, but the creator of the page eventually decided she wanted the statue to stay. The statue has also been noted for its prominent veins, scrotum, and anus, as well as its overall phallic quality.  
In September 2019, the piece was vandalized with orange graffiti on its hooves. In 2022, the sculpture was featured in the Netflix adult animated series Inside Job. Colorado Public Radio quoted an Aurora, Colorado resident as saying “The mustang is very Colorado, and then it takes a hard left turn with the red eyes and the blue.” The article quoted Dale Kronkright of the Georgia O'Keefe Museum in Santa Fe, New Mexico as calling the sculpture "brilliant" adding that "My takeaway from Mustang is defiance, this absolute expression of identity, of having a place, standing strong, being fiery, being gigantic." Another Coloradan said "We’ll chain ourselves to Mustang and he’s not going anywhere.”

Valuation 
Commissioned for $300,000, the city ended up paying $650,000 for the sculpture.  A 2007 appraisal performed just prior to the statue's completion valued the work at $2,000,000, and the city has insured the piece at this value.

References 

Denver International Airport
Fiberglass sculptures in the United States
Horses in art
Outdoor sculptures in Denver
Statues in Colorado
Vandalized works of art in Colorado